Riot Girl is the debut studio album by Japanese singer/voice actress Aya Hirano. It was released on 16 July 2008. It contains songs from her entire non-character song discography up until her 2008 single, "Unnamed World." It contains 7 all-new songs and the A-side songs from her first 7 singles (with the exception being the B-side of Unnamed World instead of the A-side). The album made its debut on the Oricon charts at number 6, selling approximately 23,000 units in its first week of sales.

Track listing

Re-release Bonus Tracks

External links
 Information on Lantis' website 
 http://www.oricon.co.jp/search/result.php?kbn=ja&types=rnk&year=2008&month=07&week=4&submit5.x=23&submit5.y=14

References

2008 debut albums
Lantis (company) albums